Michael Thomas "Bird Man" Barrett (September 5, 1943 – August 8, 2011) was an American basketball player.

He was reared in Webster Springs, West Virginia and attended Webster Springs High School through his sophomore season. Prior to his Junior season, his father accepted a job in Richwood, West Virginia where he subsequently moved his family. Mike would then finish his Junior and Senior seasons at Richwood High School.

A 6'2" guard from West Virginia Institute of Technology, Barrett participated in the 1968 Summer Olympics, where he won a gold medal for the United States national basketball team. He also played for the United States men's national basketball team at the 1967 FIBA World Championship.
From 1969 to 1973 he played professionally in the American Basketball Association as a member of the Washington Capitols, Virginia Squires, and San Diego Conquistadors. He was named to the 1970 ABA All-Rookie team, and averaged 13.4 points per game over his ABA career.

He was named West Virginia Amateur Athlete of the Year in 1968, and in 1980, he was inducted into the West Virginia Sports Hall of Fame.

Barrett died August 8, 2011, after a long illness.

References

External links

1968 Summer Olympics at USABasketball.com

1943 births
2011 deaths
Amateur Athletic Union men's basketball players
American men's basketball players
Basketball players from West Virginia
Basketball players at the 1968 Summer Olympics
Medalists at the 1968 Summer Olympics
Olympic gold medalists for the United States in basketball
People from Montgomery, West Virginia
People from Richwood, West Virginia
People from Webster Springs, West Virginia
Point guards
San Diego Conquistadors players
Shooting guards
United States men's national basketball team players
Virginia Squires players
Washington Caps players
West Virginia Tech Golden Bears men's basketball players
1967 FIBA World Championship players